Gatbawi or Stone Seated Medicine Buddha at Gwan Peak, Mt. Palgong in Gyeongsan is a Buddhist statue in Daehan-ri, Wachon-myeon, Gyeongsan, Gyeongsangbuk-do, the Republic of Korea. It was made in the Unified Silla Kingdom era and is well known with the name of Gatbawi Buddha (Stone Hat Buddha).

It is said that Uihyeon made it in order to appease his mother's soul in the 7th ruling year of Queen Seondeok of Silla Kingdom.

Legend
The legend of Daegu Gatbawi says that a big crane flew in to guard him every night while he was making this Gatbawi Buddha. It is reputed to be a miraculous Buddha stone, which makes a response to prayers if the prayer prays for it with their whole heart.

Treasures of South Korea
Buddha statues
Stone Buddha statues
Korean art
Dong District, Daegu
Gyeongsan